Jack Robinson may refer to:

Sportspeople
Jack Robinson (catcher) (1880–1921), American baseball player
Jack Robinson (footballer, born 1870) (1870–1931), England, Derby County and Southampton football goalkeeper
Jack Robinson (footballer, born 1887) (1887–?), English footballer
Jack Robinson (footballer, born 1993), English footballer
Jack Robinson (footballer, born 2001), English footballer
Jack Robinson (pitcher) (1921–2000), American baseball player
Jack Robinson (rugby league), rugby league footballer of the 1910s for Great Britain, and Rochdale Hornets
Jack 'Junker' Robinson (1892–1981), Australian rugby league footballer
Jack Robinson (horse racing), British horse racer of 1905
Jack Robinson (American football) (1913–1971), American football player
Jack Robinson (surfer) (born 1997), Australian surfer

Other people
Jack C. Robinson (1922–1942), United States Marine Corps Silver Star recipient
Jack Robinson (photographer) (1928–1997), American photographer
Jack Robinson (songwriter) (born 1938), American songwriter and music publisher
Jack Robinson (anarchist) (died 1983), anarchist activist and editor of the Freedom paper

Characters
Jack Robinson (mythical person), colloquialism

Ships
USS Jack C. Robinson (APD-72), a United States Navy high-speed transport in commission from 1945 to 1946

See also
Jackie Robinson (disambiguation)
John Robinson (disambiguation)
Robinson (name)